Kampong Katok is a village in Brunei-Muara District, Brunei, about  from the capital Bandar Seri Begawan. The population was 2,079 in 2016. It is one of the villages within Mukim Gadong 'A'. The postcode is BE2319.

Geography 

As a village subdivision, it borders Kampong Tungku and STKRJ Katok 'A' to the north, STKRJ Tungku Area 1 to the north-east, Kampong Mata-Mata to the east and south, Area 2 of STKRJ Mata-Mata to the south, Kampong Tanjong Bunut to the south-west, Kampong Selayun to the west, and Kampong Peninjau to the north-west.

Administration 
Kampong Katok shares a village head with the neighbouring village Kampong Tungku.

Address 
The location address for the public housing estates STKRJ Katok 'A' and STKRJ Katok 'B', as well as the schools Katok Secondary School and Raja Isteri Pengiran Anak Hajah Saleha Girls' Arabic Religious Secondary School which are located in STKRJ Katok 'B', is often regarded as located in the village, even though they are not within the village boundary. The aforementioned public housing estates are designated as separate village subdivisions.

References 

Katok